While there are many historical and modern schools of Taoism with different teachings on the subject, many Taoist priests regard their  diet as extremely important to their physical, mental and spiritual health in one way or another, especially where the amount of qi in the food is concerned.

Fasting

Some early Taoist diets called for bigu, based on the belief that immortality could be achieved in this way. The ancient Taoist texts of the Taiping Jing suggest that individuals who attained the state of complete ziran would not need food at all, but instead could sustain themselves by absorbing the cosmic qi.

Vegetarianism
Taoist religious orders often promote a vegetarian diet in order to minimize harm to other sentient life. Taoist levels of dietary restriction, however, are varied.

In legend, Han dynasty prince and Taoist adept Liú Ān is credited for inventing the vegetarian food tofu.

Contemporary Taoism

According to Ming Yi Wang, one version of the taoist diet includes bigu, veganism, as well as refraining from eating strong-smelling plants, traditionally asafoetida, shallot, mountain leek, and Allium chinense or other alliums, which together with garlic are referred to as wǔ hūn (五葷, or 'Five Fetid and Strong-smelling Vegetables'). Additionally, nightshades are avoided.

See also
 Ch'ang Ming

References

Further reading
 Reid, Daniel P. – The Tao of Health, Sex, and Longevity: A Modern Practical Guide to the Ancient Way 2001. 
 Saso, Michael R., A Taoist Cookbook: With Meditations Taken from the Laozi Daode Jing. Tuttle, 1994. 
 Schipper, Kristofer. The Taoist Body. Berkeley: University of California, 1993.
 Symonds, Mike. Tai Chi Diet: Food for Life. Life Force Publishing, 2007.
 Soo, Chee The Tao of Long Life. Seahorse Books, 2006.
 Welch, Holmes and Anna Seidel, eds.Facets of Taoism: Essays in Chinese Religion. New Haven: Yale University, 1979.

External links
Yoked to Earth: A Treatise on Corpse-Demons and Bigu, Frederick R. Dannaway (2009)

Taoist practices
Religion-based diets
Vegetarianism and religion
Chinese cuisine